The 1936 New York Giants season was the franchise's 54th season. The Giants went 92-62, and won the National League pennant. The team went on to lose to the New York Yankees in the 1936 World Series, four games to two.

Regular season
Carl Hubbell became the first player to win two National League MVP Awards.

Season standings

Record vs. opponents

Opening Day lineup

Roster

Player stats

Batting

Starters by position
Note: Pos = Position; G = Games played; AB = At bats; H = Hits; Avg. = Batting average; HR = Home runs; RBI = Runs batted in

Other batters
Note: G = Games played; AB = At bats; H = Hits; Avg. = Batting average; HR = Home runs; RBI = Runs batted in

Pitching

Starting pitchers
Note: G = Games pitched; IP = Innings pitched; W = Wins; L = Losses; ERA = Earned run average; SO = Strikeouts

Other pitchers
Note: G = Games pitched; IP = Innings pitched; W = Wins; L = Losses; ERA = Earned run average; SO = Strikeouts

Relief pitchers
Note: G = Games pitched; W = Wins; L = Losses; SV = Saves; ERA = Earned run average; SO = Strikeouts

1936 World Series

Game 1
September 30, 1936, at the Polo Grounds in New York City

Game 2
October 2, 1936, at the Polo Grounds in New York City

Game 3
October 3, 1936, at Yankee Stadium in New York City

Game 4
October 4, 1936, at Yankee Stadium in New York City

Game 5
October 5, 1936, at Yankee Stadium in New York City

Game 6
October 6, 1936, at the Polo Grounds in New York City

Award winners
 Carl Hubbell, National League MVP

Farm system

LEAGUE CHAMPIONS: Tallahassee

Portageville franchise transferred to Owensboro, July 17, 1936

Notes

References
 1936 New York Giants team page at Baseball Reference
 1936 New York Giants team page at Baseball Almanac

New York Giants (NL)
San Francisco Giants seasons
New York Giants season
National League champion seasons
New York
1930s in Manhattan
Washington Heights, Manhattan